The Austin Fire Department provides fire protection and first-response emergency medical services to the city of  Austin, Texas. The Austin Fire Department is the fourth largest fire department (by number of personnel) in the state of Texas.

History 
The Austin Fire Department was started in 1841 when the first fire protection organization was sanctioned by the city council consisting of a seven-man fire protection group. It was not until 1858 that the city would have a properly organized, skilled and equipped department.

Stations and apparatus

See also
 Austin Central Fire Station 1
 Buford Tower

References

External links

Fire departments in Texas
Fire
Fire